The Basque Pelota World Cup (not to be confused with the Basque Pelota World Championship) is a set of four quadrennial tournaments organized by the International Federation of Basque Pelota on each of the disciplines of Basque Pelota: Trinquete, Fronton 30m, Fronton 36m and Fronton 54m. The FIPV organizes this tournaments on the years where the World Championships is not played.

History
The first World Cup tournament was played in 1995, only for men, in the discipline of Fronton 36m, with the modalities of Hand pelota (individual and pairs), Paleta cuero and Pala corta. The second tournament was played in 1997 in the discipline of Trinquete, including modalities of Hand pelota (men's individual and pairs), Xare, Paleta cuero and Paleta goma (men and women). The third tournament was played in 1998 in the discipline of Fronton 30m, including modalities of Frontenis (men and women) and Paleta goma (men). In 2001, the first Fronton 54m World Cup was introduced, with the modality of Cesta Punta. In 2017, FIPV organized the first World Cup of a new discipline called Frontball, though this was not included as part of the 2018 World Championships

Editions

Fronton 36m World Cup

Trinquete World Cup

Fronton 30m World Cup

Fronton 54m World Cup

Frontball World Cup

See also
Basque Pelota World Championships

References

World Cup
World cups
Recurring sporting events established in 1995
1995 establishments in Spain